Ole Sorensen (born 23 April 1948) is a Canadian wrestler. He competed in the men's Greco-Roman 68 kg at the 1972 Summer Olympics.

References

1948 births
Living people
Canadian male sport wrestlers
Olympic wrestlers of Canada
Wrestlers at the 1972 Summer Olympics
People from Randers
Commonwealth Games medallists in wrestling
Commonwealth Games bronze medallists for Canada
Wrestlers at the 1970 British Commonwealth Games
Wrestlers at the 1966 British Empire and Commonwealth Games
20th-century Canadian people
Medallists at the 1970 British Commonwealth Games